Borkheide is a municipality in the Potsdam-Mittelmark district, in Brandenburg, Germany.

History
From 1815 to 1947, Borkheide was part of the Prussian Province of Brandenburg. From 1952 to 1990, it was part of the Bezirk Potsdam of East Germany.

Demography

References

Localities in Potsdam-Mittelmark
Fläming Heath